The 1811 Great fire of Podil occurred on the morning of July 9, 1811 in the historical and commercial neighborhood of Podil in Kiev (Kyiv), the capital of Ukraine. The fire lasted for three days and almost destroyed the whole neighborhood. Before the fire, Podil was the city's most densely populated neighborhood; out of 3,672 households in the city, 2,068 were located in the Podil.

It was speculated that the fire was set by French spies or by their local collaborators on the eve of the French invasion of Russia.

The fire's power was strengthened with high winds and the season's severe droughts, from which even the nearby Dnieper River was reported to have been dried out. The city's official version of events regarding the cause of the fire, however, was said to be children playing with fire.

More than 2,000 homes, magistrate buildings, 12 churches, and 3 monasteries were destroyed in the fire. In response to the fire, the Director of the Kiev Myshkovsky Gymnasium No. 3 stated: 

In 1812, a new plan for the reconstruction of Podil was drawn up by architects Geste and Melensky. The plan had redrawn the neighborhood's curved streets into straightaways, thus creating the square city blocks that exist to this day. The fire showed the vulnerability of the city's wooden buildings, some of which would later be reconstructed in stone. Reconstruction after the fire brought about the construction of many architectural landmarks currently standing, including the Contracts House and Gostnyi Dvir, among many others.

Nevertheless, some streets remained in the shape they were in before the fire. These are Borychiv Tik, Pokrovska, Pritisko-Mykilska, per.Khoryva.

See also
1961 Kurenivka mudslide in Kyiv
Scorched earth

References

Great fire of Podil
19th century in Kyiv
Disasters in the Russian Empire
Great Fire Of Podil, 1811
Fires in Ukraine
Urban fires in Europe
July 1811 events
1811 disasters in the Russian Empire